Abdurasul Abudulam (born 10 March 2001), known simply as Abudu before 2019, is a Chinese footballer currently playing as a midfielder for Shandong Taishan.

Club career
Abudu would play for the Shandong youth team before being promoted to their senior team. To gain more time he would be loaned out to the China U19 team and subsequently the China U20 team, who were allowed to take part in the third tier of the Chinese pyramid. On his return he would go on to make his debut for Shandong on 3 July 2022 in a league game against Guangzhou City that ended in a 2-0 victory. This would be followed by his first goal for the club, which was in a league game on 26 November 2022 against Wuhan Yangtze River in a 5-0 victory. He would go on to gain more playing time and go on to be part of the squad that won the 2022 Chinese FA Cup with the team.

Career statistics
.

Notes

Honours

Club
Shandong Taishan
Chinese FA Cup: 2022.

References

External links

2001 births
Living people
Chinese footballers
China youth international footballers
Association football midfielders
China League Two players
Shandong Taishan F.C. players